Maroa Township is located in Macon County, Illinois. As of the 2010 census, its population was 2,100 and it contained 883 housing units.

The township was named after the Maroa Indians.

Cities and towns 
 Emery
 Maroa

Adjacent townships 
 Texas Township, DeWitt County (north)
 Creek Township, DeWitt County (northeast)
 Friends Creek Township (east)
 Hickory Point Township (southeast)
 Whitmore Township (southeast)
 Hickory Point Township (south)
 Illini Township (southwest)
 Austin Township (west)
 Tunbridge Township, DeWitt County (northwest)

Geography

Demographics

References

External links
 US Census
 City-data.com
 Illinois State Archives

Townships in Macon County, Illinois
Townships in Illinois